Rosecrans station is a busway station located in Los Angeles, California. It is situated between the Harbor Freeway station and the Harbor Gateway Transit Center on the J Line, a bus rapid transit route which runs between El Monte, Downtown Los Angeles and San Pedro as part of the Metro Busway system. The station consists of two side platforms in the center of Interstate 110 under Rosecrans Avenue. The station serves the Harbor Gateway neighborhoods of Los Angeles.

Rosecrans station was built between 1989 and 1996 as part of the Harbor Transitway project and opened to passengers on August 1, 1996. J Line buses serve the station twenty-four hours a day; the headway between buses is about four minutes during peak periods, with less frequent service at other times. Rosecrans station is also served by Metro Express route 550 and Torrance Transit route 4, which only run during weekday peak periods.

Layout
The below-grade platforms are accessed from two ground-level plazas on the north and south sides of East Rosecrans Avenue between Figueroa Street and Vermont Avenue. The ground-level plazas each have a TAP card ticket vending machine that was added in early 2017 to support all-door boarding on the J Line. The station has 202 park and ride spaces in a parking lot built into one of the "leaves" of the partial cloverleaf interchange between Rosecrans Avenue and Interstate 110.

Services

Rosecrans station is used by the Metro J Line bus rapid transit route which runs between the El Monte Station in El Monte, Downtown Los Angeles and the Harbor Gateway Transit Center in Gardena, California, with select trips continuing onto San Pedro. The J Line is part of the Metro Busway system. 

In addition to J Line buses, the busway platforms at Rosecrans station are also served by two routes, geared towards people commuting to Los Angeles, operating only during weekday rush-hours, operating towards the city in the morning and returning at night: Metro Express route 550 to San Pedro and Torrance Transit route 4X to Torrance (also operates all-day Saturday). The station is also served by the Dodger Stadium Express shuttle that operates during home games during baseball season.

At street level, Rosecrans station is also served by Metro Local route 125 that runs between El Segundo and Norwalk station via Rosecrans.

References 

Los Angeles Metro Busway stations
J Line (Los Angeles Metro)
Public transportation in Los Angeles
Harbor Gateway, Los Angeles
Transport infrastructure completed in 1996
1996 establishments in California
Bus stations in Los Angeles